The Party of the Roma (PRPE), known until 2008 as Social Democratic Party of the Roma (PRS-D), is a political party in Romania representing the Romani minority. Its leader is Nicolae Păun, and it currently has one reserved seat in the Chamber of Deputies.

Parliamentary representation 

Founded in 1990, after the Romanian Revolution, the Party of the Roma is the official political association of the Romani minority in Romania and consequently has one reserved seat in the Chamber of Deputies, regardless of its electoral performance. The party has contested every election since the 1992 suffrage, but has never passed the 5% threshold required for it to gain extra seats. 

At the 2000, 2004, and 2012 legislative elections, the Party of the Roma signed a protocol of reciprocal electoral support with the Social Democratic Party (PSD).

The reserved seat has been held by Gheorghe Răducanu between 1992–1996, by Mădălin Voicu between 1996–2000, and by Nicolae Păun between 2000–2004 and since 2004 onwards.

Local representation 

At the 2016 Romanian local elections, 143 municipal councillors and one mayor, Dumitru Mircea in Brăhășești, were elected on behalf of the PRPE.

Electoral history

Legislative elections

European elections

References 

Political parties established in 1990
Political parties of minorities in Romania
Non-registered political parties in Romania
Romani in Romania
Romani political parties
Social democratic parties in Romania
1990 establishments in Romania